Wine Folly is a website founded in October 2011 in Seattle, Washington, by Madeline Puckette and developer Justin Hammack. The website is an educational wine blog that publishes articles, videos, courses, and infographics to help simplify wine. The blog uses charts, diagrams, and other visuals to educate readers.

History
Puckette studied graphic design at California Institute of the Arts. At age 27, she began working at a wine tasting room in Reno, Nevada and eventually took the Court of Master Sommeliers' certification exam.

Using content from the blog, Puckette and Hammack wrote the reference guide, Wine Folly: The Essential Guide to Wine, which was published by Avery in 2015. In November 2015, the book hit The New York Times Best Seller list for food and diet books.

In 2018, Wine Folly: Magnum Edition, The Master Guide was published. Wine writer Keith Wallace placed the blog at the top of the list of his "Eleven Wine Blogs to Follow."

In 2019, Wine Folly merged with the Global Wine Database to become Folly Enterprises.

References

External links 
 

Wine websites
American educational websites